The Alte Burg (also Alte Burg im Quecken or Alte Burg "am Quecken") in Bad Münstereifel, Germany, is a circular rampart that is the remains of a fortification from the Carolingian period. The refuge castle acted as a place of retreat for the local population and as protection for the daughter monastery of Prüm Abbey. The defences dating to the 9th century have been designated as a protected monument. The castle site lies within the county of Euskirchen in the state of North Rhine-Westphalia.

There were at least two periods of construction. In the northeast is a motte.

In the highest section of the site, the rubble stone foundation of a round tower has survived. In the 19th century a silver coin bearing the image of Louis the Pious is supposed to have been found here; it has not survived. In 1972 parts of the site were archaeologically investigated. During the excavations shards of pottery from the 9th century with decorations (Rollrädchenverzierung) were discovered.

Literature
 Karl Hürten: Die wiedergefundene ‚Alte Burg‘ bei Münstereifel. In: Rheinische Geschichtsblätter. Zeitschrift für Geschichte, Sprache und Altertümer des Mittel- und Niederrheins, Vol. 9. Bonn, 1909 (Online publication)
 Felix Hauptmann: Die Alte Burg bei Münstereifel.  In: Rheinische Geschichtsblätter. Zeitschrift für Geschichte, Sprache und Altertümer des Mittel- und Niederrheins, Vol. 8. Bonn, 1905 (Online publication)

External links
 Tour Nordeifel
 The Alte Burg im Quecken (pdf; 1.2 MB)

Castles in North Rhine-Westphalia
Archaeological sites in Germany
Euskirchen (district)